Following the dissolution of the Soviet Union at the end of 1991, the Russian Navy struggled to adjust Cold War force structures while suffering severely with insufficient maintenance and a lack of funding. However, improvements in the Russian economy over the first decade of the twenty-first century led to a significant rise in defence expenditure and an increase in the number of ships under construction (with a focus on blue-water vessels).

An extensive rearmament program was implemented after 2011, with the Russian Defence Ministry expected to procure 100 warships by 2020. In early 2013 it was reported that the navy was to receive 54 new warships of various classes plus 24 submarines by 2020. A report by the US Navy's Office of Naval Intelligence issued in December 2015 provided descriptions and timelines for the construction of a modern 21st century Russian Navy.

Some of these plans were modified over the course of the decade with delays pushing back the procurement of major surface combatants. During the 2010s, the focus shifted to several new classes of lighter units (corvettes) as well as on the procurement of several classes of new nuclear and conventionally-powered submarines. In addition, the new s have begun to enter service and the large Priboy-class helicopter assault ships have also started construction. These programs are expected to continue through the 2020s and, depending on available funding, projects to acquire larger frigates (the Super-Gorshkov - Project 22350M) and destroyers/cruisers may also be initiated. However, until the arrival of such heavier units, older classes of Soviet-era cruisers and destroyers are being modernized.

The economic and financial fallout from the Covid-19 pandemic is likely to have some impact on Russian Navy modernization plans. In September 2020 it was reported that the defence budget was to be cut by 5% as part of a shift to social spending and in response the financial impacts of the pandemic. However, the specific impact of such a cut on Russian Navy modernization plans was not immediately known.

Likely even more significant is the impact of sanctions imposed on the Russian Federation after the 2022 Russian invasion of Ukraine. In 2021, Russian Security Council Secretary Nikolai Patrushev reportedly acknowledged that the Russian defense industry “is still dependent on foreign technologies.” In an interview with the head of United Shipbuilding Corporation Alexei Rakhmanov on 15 August 2022, he stated that the effects of sanctions on the Russian shipbuilding industry are practically unnoticeable, with only 5% of components for military shipbuilding (mainly electronics) being dependent on foreign imports.

On 31 July 2022 during Russian Navy Day, Vladimir Putin approved a new maritime doctrine for Russia. The new doctrine suggests an increased state focus on the Arctic and the Northern Sea Route, as well as an increased naval presence in the Mediterranean and Red Seas, both using already-established bases and establishing new bases on other territories in the area. Plans for the development of shipbuilding industries in Crimea were also mentioned, as well as the development of new LNG terminals and shipbuilding industries in the Far East. With the US and Allies identified as the major maritime threat, cooperation with India and Middle Eastern allies was also emphasised, as well as the necessity for increased foreign port visits by Russian Navy vessels.

Surface combatants

Future aircraft carriers
In 2005, it was announced that the Russian Navy was planning a class of two to four new aircraft carriers, the production of which could start in 2013–14 for initial service entry in 2017. Jane's said it was not clear whether "this was a funded programme". In mid-2007, the new Navy chief announced plans to reform the country's naval forces and build a blue-water navy with the world's second largest fleet of aircraft carriers, aiming to create 6 aircraft carrier strike groups in the next 20 years.

Russian President Dmitriy Medvedev stated in 2008 that Russia intended to build nuclear aircraft carriers in the next decade. However Russia currently does not have a yard capable of building aircraft carriers. All previous Soviet aircraft carriers were built in what was then known as the Nikolayev South Shipyard (Shipyard 444) at Nikolayev in what is now Ukraine. On 2 August 2010 Vladimir Vysotskiy stressed their importance: "If, for example, we do not have an aircraft carrier in the North, the combat capability of the Northern Fleet's guided-missile submarines will be reduced to zero after Day One because the submarines' principal adversary is aviation."

Speaking in Saint Petersburg on 30 June 2011, the head of United Shipbuilding Corporation, a Russian state holding company, said his company expected to begin design work for a new carrier in 2016, with a goal of beginning construction in 2018 and having the carrier achieve initial operational capability by 2023. Several months later, on 3 November 2011 the Russian newspaper Izvestiya reported the naval building plan now included (first) the construction of a new shipyard capable of building large hull ships, after which Moscow will build four nuclear-powered aircraft carriers by 2023. The spokesperson said one carrier would be assigned to the Russian Navy's Northern Fleet at Murmansk, and the second would be stationed with the Pacific Fleet at Vladivostok.

In February 2015, Russian media said that the Krylov State Research Center in St. Petersburg was on its way towards developing another aircraft carrier. The design was under conceptual testing in Krylov's laboratory. There was no announcement of what shipyard would be able to build the carrier. One super-carrier project has been code-named Project 23000E or "Shtorm". As of 2020, the project had not yet been approved and, given the financial costs, it was unclear whether it would be made a priority over other elements of Russian naval modernization.

In July 2021, the Director General of United Shipbuilding Corporation  stated that best suited for the construction of new aircraft carrier in Russia is Sevmash.

In December 2021, a First Vice-chairman of Military-Industrial Commission of Russia Andrey Yelchaninov stated in an interview that the construction of a new aircraft carrier is being considered for the new State Armament Program for 2024–2033. Work is currently underway to assess the financial and technological risks in the construction of such a ship.

In the new naval doctrine approved on 31 July 2022, the development of new modern shipbuilding facilities in the Far East was mentioned, particularly for the construction of large vessels such as aircraft carriers.

In an interview on 15 August 2022, the head of United Shipbuilding Corporation Alexei Rakhmanov stated that the company is ready to build any large warship, including aircraft carriers, after the modernisation of Severnaya Verf is completed. He also confirmed that if the construction of a new aircraft carrier is approved, the majority of the work will be done at Severnaya Verf.

Destroyers

In 2014 it was reported that the specification had been signed off for a new anti-air destroyer. Twelve ships of the 10,000 tonne Lider class are planned to enter service, split between the Northern and Pacific Fleets. Undecided whether versions will use nuclear or conventional power but they will carry the ABM-capable S-500 SAM and Kalibr (SS-N-30) and (SS-N-27) cruise missiles. The Lider-class destroyer concept is a project of JSC Severnoye. In May 2015, Jane's reported that the Krylov State Research Center has also developed the Project 23560 destroyer design concept.

Initial reporting said that these ships would enter service in 2023–2025. In January 2018 however it was reported that detailed design phase will start after 2020 and construction in 2025. On 18 April 2020 Russian newspaper Interfax reported that the Severnoye Design Bureau had suspended development on the Lider. However, in June Alexei Rakhmanov, head of the United Shipbuilding Corporation, reported that the Lider project was still moving forward.

In an interview on 15 August 2022, the head of United Shipbuilding Corporation Alexei Rakhmanov stated that the Lider-class destroyer project has not been abandoned, however, he also stated that the Russian Ministry of Defence will only approve one project for large ocean-going warships. The Russian MoD currently favours the Project 22350M Super-Gorshkov frigate, and therefore it is unlikely that the Lider-class destroyer project will be approved for construction.

Frigates

An initial order of six Project 22350 s are under construction for the Russian Navy. As of 2020, the Severnaya Verf Shipyard in Saint Petersburg had received orders for ten units, with up to 15 planned. The first of the class,  was laid down in 2006, launched on 29 October 2010 and originally planned to be delivered by 2012. The second unit has been launched, the third and fourth are under construction.  As of June 2017 the Admiral Gorshkov, lead ship of class, was undergoing trials with delivery to the fleet expected by year's end. In 2019 the Admiral Gorshkov completed a circumnavigation of the globe on its maiden voyage.  The second unit  was commissioned with the Northern Fleet in July 2020. A further development of this class is the Project 22350M, the so-called "Super Gorshkov" class variant, on which design work was underway as of 2020.

In addition, six s were ordered and under construction at Yantar Shipyard in Kaliningrad, with the first laid down on 18 December 2010 and scheduled for delivery by 2013. Three of these frigates serve in the Black Sea Fleet, with two of the remainder having been sold to India and a third also planned to be sold abroad. The lead ship, the Admiral Grigorovich, was commissioned on 11 March 2016.  The second and third units, Admiral Essen and Admiral Makarov have been delivered and are operational with the Black Sea Fleet.

Jane's Defence Weekly and NavyRecognition.com claimed in March and January 2015 respectively that the Project 20385 (Gremyashchiy), Project 21631 (Buyan-M), Project 22350 (Admiral Gorshkov), and Project 11356Р/М (Admiral Grigorovich-class) corvettes and frigates were dependent on German and Ukrainian engines. Projects 20385 and 21631 used German diesel engines, while the 22350 and 11356M used Ukrainian-assembled turbines. Given the sanctions and standoff over the War in Ukraine, these components were not available from 2015. As a result, two more s, the seventh and eighth of the class, were laid down in February 2015. The Steregushchiy class uses Russian-built Kolomna engines. Similarly, the power plant in units of the Admiral Gorshkov class (following on the first two) were adapted to use a CODAG diesel and gas turbine engine of Russian manufacture (UEC-Saturn).
In November 2020 it was announced that United Engine Corporation had initiated delivery of the DGTA M55R diesel-gas power plant which would be installed on frigates of the 22350-class beginning with Admiral Isakov.

Corvettes

With respect to corvettes/large patrol ships, as of 2021 six separate classes were in production to replace Soviet-era vessels. They ranged in size from the small 800-860-ton Karakurt class (Project 22800) up to the 3,400-ton Project 20386 corvette/light frigate. The first of the 2,500-ton Gremyashchiy class (Project 20385) entered service in December 2020. Corvette classes in production as of 2020 include:

 Project 22800  (800-860 tons)
 Project 21630/31  - Buyan-M (Project 21631-variant - 950 tons)
 Project 22160 Vasily Bykov-class corvette/offshore patrol ship (1,700 tons)
 Project 20380 /light frigate (2,200 tons)
 Project 20385 /light frigate (2,500 tons)
 Project 20386 Derzky-class corvette/light frigate (3,400 tons)

Submarines
The State Armament Program 2011–2020 was expected to build and deliver up to 24 submarines (both nuclear and conventional) to the Russian Navy.

Borei SSBN

Before 2012 there were only about ten nuclear submarine patrols a year, each lasting three months at most and usually a lot less.

However, in that same year the first unit of the  ballistic missile submarine entered service. Three Borei-class boats were initially built. The lead boat, Yuriy Dolgorukiy, was launched in April 2007, began sea trials in June 2009 and was commissioned as a part of the Northern Fleet in 2012. The second boat, Aleksandr Nevskiy was scheduled to be delivered to the Pacific Fleet in 2012. The third was named Vladimir Monomakh. The Yuriy Dolgorukiy is operational with the Northern Fleet, while the Aleksandr Nevskiy and Vladimir Monomakh serve in the Pacific Fleet. A fourth unit, Knyaz Vladimir, to a modified Borei-A design, was laid down in 2012. Six more units to this modified design were subsequently ordered, the Kynaz Oleg and Generalissimus Suvorov being laid down in 2014, two more in 2015 and 2016, and another two in 2021. The mainstay of the SSBN force, the Delta IVs, joined the fleet during 1985–91. While the service life of an SSBN normally is twenty to twenty-five years, without maintenance, it may be as short as ten to fifteen years. As of the end of 2022, there are six units in active service and an additional four units under construction. Two further boats were planned to start construction in 2023 and be in service by the early 2030s.

Yasen SSN

12  nuclear attack submarines are to be delivered to the Russian Navy. Severodvinsk, keel laid down on 21 December 1993, was the first boat of the class slated for launch in 1998 delayed due to problems in financing. In 1996 work on the submarine appeared to have stopped completely. Some reports suggested that as of 1999 the submarine was less than 10 percent completed. In 2003, the project received additional funding and the work of finishing the submarine continued. In 2004 it was reported that the work on the submarine was moving forward, but due to the priority given to the new , Severodvinsk, the lead unit of the Yasen class would not be ready before 2010. In July 2006 the deputy chairman of the Military-Industrial Commission, Vladislav Putilin, stated that two Yasen-class submarines were to join the Russian Navy before 2015. On 24 July 2009 the work on a second Yasen submarine, named Kazan, was started. On 26 July the Russian navy command announced that one multipurpose submarine would be laid down every year, not necessarily of this class, starting in 2011. The launch of the first boat of this class and the beginning of sea trials was reported in September 2011.

As of August 2022 the Severodvinsk, Kazan and Novosibirsk are operational, Krasnoyarsk began sea trials in June 2022, and five more units are under construction.

Kilo

Following on from the success of the Kilo-class submarines, improved design Project 636.3 units are being built for the Russian Navy. Six s have been built for the Black Sea Fleet, four for the Pacific Fleet (as of 2022) with further units on order.

In an interview on 15 August 2022, the head of United Shipbuilding Corporation Alexei Rakhmanov stated that the company is currently producing one Project 636.3 submarine per year, however this can be increased to two per year with more funding. He also stated that a few modernisation proposals are being considered, including the ability to carry more Kalibr cruise missiles.

Lada and Amur

The  (Project 677) began construction in the latter 1990s. The class experienced significant problems and delays, resulting in a halt to series production and a redesign of the vessels. Series production resumed in the mid-2010s and as of 2022 the first unit is in service, the second on sea trials and four more vessels are under construction or ordered. 

On 18 May 2013 Russian Navy Commander-in-Chief Admiral Viktor Chirkov announced that the Lada-class would receive an air-independent propulsion system by 2016–2017. However, in 2019, Alexander Buzakov, the head of the Admiralty Shipyard, indicated that there were no plans to equip the Lada class with an air-independent propulsion system. The  is advertised as an export version of the Lada class.

Haski (Husky)

The Laika class, Russian designation [[Laika-class submarine|Project 545 Laika]], also referred to as Husky class, are series of nuclear-powered fifth-generation multi-purpose submarines currently under development by Malakhit Marine Engineering Bureau for the Russian Navy.

In an interview on 15 August 2022, the head of United Shipbuilding Corporation Alexei Rakhmanov confirmed that the development of fifth-generation submarines is continuing according to schedule. It is unknown if he was referring to the Laika-class submarine, or an as-of-yet (August 2022) unannounced project.Khabarovsk (Project 09851)

The  is a new submarine class based on the Borei class but with missile tubes removed. To be armed with Status-6 Oceanic Multipurpose System.' Special Operations Submarine

Belgorod was delivered to the Russian Navy in July 2022 but is expected to remain in an "experimental role" with the Northern Fleet for an indefinite period before transferring to the Pacific Fleet. She is a derivative of the  reportedly designed as a combination special operations and strategic weapons submarine. She is planned to act as a mothership for smaller special operations submarines as well as being armed with six Status-6 Oceanic Multipurpose System weapons.

Amphibious vessels

Landing ships
The first of an unknown number of new  of amphibious ships was laid down in 2004 and was launched in May 2012. The ship was to be delivered to the Navy in 2013. The Ivan Gren was delivered to the Navy in June 2018. In 2010 it was announced that work on a second unit had begun. The second ship, Petr Morgunov, was commissioned in 2020 with further enlarged vessels of the class under construction.

Amphibious assault ships
Russian officials negotiated a purchase of four s. On 24 May 2010, the Russian defense minister said that Russia was in pre-contract discussions with Spain, the Netherlands, and France on purchasing four Mistral-class ships.  It was planned to have one ship built abroad, two with the participation of Russian shipbuilders, and at least one built in Russia. The Minister also said that the first ships of this type would be based in the Northern and Pacific Fleets. On 24 December 2010 Russian President Dmitriy Medvedev announced France as the winner of a tender to build four Mistral-class ships for Russia. As the MISTRAL project continued it was plagued with controversy with arguments that the ships are not required, that Russian ship builders could have built a similar vessel and that they cost too much. In January 2013, Russian Deputy Prime Minister for the Defence Industry Dmitriy Rogozin was critical about the purchase of French helicopter carriers Mistral. The contracts signed in 2011 had been also criticized by first deputy head of the Military-Industrial Commission Ivan Kharchenko, who blamed former defence minister Anatoliy Serdyukov. "It is very strange that we, given our climate, are purchasing ships to transport troops that do not work at temperatures below seven degrees," Rogozin said at a general meeting of the Academy of Military Sciences on 26 January 2013.

On 18 May 2013 it was announced that the second Mistral-class helicopter carrier would be named Sevastopol and join Russia's Black Sea Fleet in 2017. It was speculated that it would be based in the Novorossiysk naval base which Spetsstroy, the strategic infrastructure builder, was to complete by that time. Other sources reported that both of the first two Mistral-class helicopter carriers, the Vladivostok and the Sevastopol would be assigned to the Pacific Fleet in 2014 and 2015 respectively after their completion in France. In Vladivostok, Berth 33 was being renovated for them.

On 3 September 2014, French President announced that due to Russia's "recent actions in Ukraine", the two ships would not be delivered. In November 2014, François Hollande placed a hold on the delivery of the first Mistral'' to Russia in view of the conflict in east Ukraine. Hollande set two conditions for delivery: the observation of a ceasefire in Ukraine and a political agreement between Moscow and Kiev. On 5 August 2015 it was announced that France was to pay back Russia's partial payments and keep the two ships initially produced for Russia.

In June 2015, during the «ARMY-2015» military-technical forum, Russia unveiled two designs for its future amphibious assault ships. The heavier "Lavina" variant with displacement of 24,000 tons, designed by Krylov State Research Center and equivalent more or less to a Mistral-class and a smaller "Priboy" variant, designed by Nevskoe Design Bureau with 14,000 tons displacement. During 2016–2017, both the heavier and lighter variant proposed for the Russian Navy started to publicly appear under a common name "Priboy".

In June 2017, the construction of two future amphibious assault ships for the Russian Navy was included in the Russia's new state armament programme for 2018–2025. The cost for one ship is to be about 40 billion RUB ($675 million).

In January 2018, it was reported the construction of the ships would take place at the Severnaya Verf in Saint Petersburg. However, in July 2020 two units of the class were laid down at the Zalyv Shipbuilding yard in Crimea. The design called for a ship of more than 30,000 tons with the delivery of both units anticipated in the latter 2020s.

Mine-countermeasure vessels
Up to thirty s are planned by 2035. As of 2020, four are active and additional units are under construction or ordered. In January 2018 Deputy Chief of the Naval Shipbuilding Directorate Captain Mikhail Krasnopeyev said that the Russian Navy is planning to acquire 10 new Alexandrit-class (Project 12700) minesweepers by 2027 and 30 by 2035. In 2019, the Commander-in-Chief of the Navy, Admiral Vladimir Korolyov, significantly enhanced that objective stating that the aim was to have 40 Alexandrit-class mine warfare vessels in service by 2030.

Minor surface combatants

Several classes of patrol units are under construction for the Navy and the Russian Coast Guard, including:

 Project 23550 icebreaking patrol ships

Auxiliary ships
A new ship class to replace the Ob-class hospital ships can be constructed at Severnaya Verf or Baltic Shipyard.

In the new naval doctrine approved on 31 July 2022, the necessity to construction new modern hospital ships was mentioned.

See also
 List of active Russian Navy ships
 Russian Armed Forces

References

External links 
Russia Will Not Have a New Aircraft Carrier for at Least 15 Years—and Maybe Never (June 2019)
Russian Strategic Submarine Patrols Rebound

Ships of the Russian Navy
Russian and Soviet military-related lists
Russian Navy
Military planning